The American Racing Pigeon Union (AU) is a national organization for pigeon racing hobbyists. The organization was founded November 9, 1910, in Washington, D.C., to centralize regional clubs, establish standardized rules, award cash prizes and promote the racing of homing carrier pigeons.

The AU comprises approximately 700 affiliated clubs with a membership 7,500 members. The national office is located in Oklahoma City, Oklahoma.

References

External links
 ARPU website

Pigeon racing
Nonprofit hobbyist organizations based in the United States
Non-profit organizations based in Oklahoma